Lee Tae-yeop (born June 16, 1959) is a Korean football forward who played for South Korea in the 1980 President's Cup and the 1980 Asian Cup. He also played for Seoul City.

Since March 2016, he has been the manager of Yeonggwang FC in the K3 League.

International record

External links

South Korean footballers
South Korea international footballers
1959 births
Living people
Association football forwards
1980 AFC Asian Cup players